Music for 3 Pianos is an EP by Harold Budd, Ruben Garcia and Daniel Lentz.

Track listing 
 "Pulse Pause Repeat" – 4:16
 "La Muchacha De Los Sueños Dorados" – 4:38
 "Iris" – 2:37
 "Somos Tres" – 2:33
 "The Messenger" – 3:06
 "La Casa Bruja" – 4:38

References 

 Track titles can be verified through the Amazon.com product page.

Harold Budd albums
1992 EPs
All Saints Records EPs
Ambient albums